Viqarunnisa University is a private university in Bangladesh. It was established in 2001. The university is on Bailey Road, Dhaka.

Former member of the national parliament of Bangladesh and businessman Dr HBM Iqbal is the chairman of the Viqarunnisa University Foundation. In 2002, the University Grants Commission (UGC) brought allegations of in setting up the institution against the chairman. In 2003, the supreme court asked concerned authorities to reopen the university.

The university is named after the prominent Austrian Pakistani social worker, Viqar un Nisa Noon.

See also 
Viqarunnisa Noon College

Footnotes 

Educational institutions established in 2001
2001 establishments in Bangladesh
Universities and colleges in Dhaka